The 1985–86 DDR-Oberliga season was the 38th season of the DDR-Oberliga, the top level of ice hockey in East Germany. Two teams participated in the league, and SC Dynamo Berlin won the championship.

Game results

 
Dynamo Berlin wins series 16:4 in points.

References

External links
East German results 1970-1990

1989-90
Ger
Oberliga
1985 in East German sport
1986 in East German sport